The 1957 New Zealand tour rugby to Australia was the 19th tour by the New Zealand national rugby union team to Australia. 

The last tour of "All Blacks" in Australia was the 1947 tour, then Australians visit New Zealand in 1952 and in 1955

All Blacks won all both test matches and the Bledisloe Cup, lost in 1949.

The tour 
Scores and results list All Blacks' points tally first.

External links 
 New Zealand in Australia 1957 from rugbymuseum.co.nz

New Zealand
New Zealand tour
Australia tour
New Zealand national rugby union team tours of Australia